Southern Nights is the thirty-second album by American singer/guitarist Glen Campbell, released in 1977 (see 1977 in music).

Track listing

Side 1:
 "Southern Nights" (Allen Toussaint) – 3:07
 "This Is Sarah's Song" (Jimmy Webb) – 2:34
 "For Cryin' Out Loud" (Micheal Smotherman) – 3:03
 "God Only Knows" (Brian Wilson, Tony Asher) – 3:18
 "Sunflower" (Neil Diamond) – 2:50

Side 2:
 "Guide Me" (John Jennings) – 2:24
 "Early Morning Song" (Jimmy Webb) – 3:30
 "(I'm Getting) Used to the Crying" (Roger Miller, Micheal Smotherman) – 2:47
 "Let Go" (Brian Cadd) – 3:30
 "How High Did We Go" (Victoria Medlin, Ned Albright) – 3:04

Personnel
Glen Campbell – vocals, acoustic guitars, electric guitars
Scott Mathews – drums, dobro
Carl Jackson – banjo, acoustic guitars, electric guitars
Fred Tackett – acoustic guitar
Bill McCubbin – bass guitar
Bill Graham – bass guitar
Dennis McCarthy – piano
Jimmy Webb – piano
Micheal Smotherman – keyboards
David Foster – keyboards
David Paich – keyboards
George Green – drums
Joe Porcaro – drums                     
Milt Holland – percussion
Gayle Levant – harp
Ethan Reilly – pedal steel guitar
Billie Barnum, Stephanie Spruill, Ann White, Darlene Groncki, Mary Arnold, Patti Brooks, Martie McCall - backing vocals

Production
Producers – Gary Klein, Glen Campbell
Arranged & conducted by Charlie Calello
"This Is Sarah's Song" and "Early Morning Song" arranged and conducted by Jimmy Webb
"Sunflower", "Let Go", "Guide Me" and "How High Did We Go" arranged by Jack Nitzsche and conducted by Alan Broadbent
Engineers – Armin Steiner, Linda Tyler, Al Schmitt, Greg Venable, Hugh Davies, Joe Jorgensen
Mixing – Armin Steiner, Godfrey Diamond
Production coordinator – Rosemary Xhiaverini
Art direction – Roy Kohara
Photography – Kenny Rogers
Illustration – Gary van der Steur

Charts

Weekly charts

Year-end charts

Singles

References

Glen Campbell albums
1977 albums
Albums conducted by Jimmy Webb
Albums arranged by Jimmy Webb
Albums arranged by Jack Nitzsche
Albums produced by Gary Klein (producer)
Capitol Records albums
Albums recorded at Capitol Studios